Albert O'Connor (July 15, 1843 – April 3, 1928) served in the Union Army during the American Civil War. He received the Medal of Honor.

O'Connor was born on July 15, 1843, in East Hereford, Quebec. His official residence was listed as Lodi, Wisconsin. He joined the US Army from West Point, Wisconsin, in June 1861, and mustered out in July 1865. He died in Orting, Washington, and was buried in Washington Soldiers Home Cemetery.

Medal of Honor citation
His award citation reads:

For extraordinary heroism on March 31 & 1 April 1865, while serving with Company A, 7th Wisconsin Infantry, in action at Gravelly Run, Virginia. On 31 March 1865, with a comrade, Sergeant O'Connor recaptured a Union officer from a detachment of nine Confederates, capturing three of the detachment and dispersing the remainder, and on 1 April 1865, he seized a stand of Confederate colors, killing a Confederate officer in a hand-to-hand contest over the colors and retaining the colors until surrounded by Confederates and compelled to relinquish them.

See also

List of American Civil War Medal of Honor recipients: M–P
William Sickles

References

1843 births
1928 deaths
Military personnel from Wisconsin
People of Wisconsin in the American Civil War
People from Lodi, Wisconsin
United States Army Medal of Honor recipients
Union Army soldiers
Canadian-born Medal of Honor recipients
Pre-Confederation Canadian emigrants to the United States
American Civil War recipients of the Medal of Honor
People from Orting, Washington